Mohammad Mohibul Haque, or Dr. Muhibul Haque is a scholar and professor of international politics, Indian polity, minority rights and human rights at the Department of Political Science at Aligarh Muslim University. He was awarded President of India Dr. Shankar Dayal Sharma Gold Medal for Excellence during his studies.
He speaks English, Hindi, and Urdu languages. Haque is also a prolific writer and author of several articles, research papers, chapters in the edited books on socio-political issues of national and international importance. He has also authored a book (International Terrorism and Violence: A Human Rights Perspective). He has done research on the topic of The Rights of Minorities in India: The Role of the National Commission for Minorities.

He is President of University Debating and Literary Club (UDLC) and instrumental in organizing AMU Literary Festivals. which is popular literary fest in north India. He is also Secretary of People's Union for Civil Liberties (PUCL), Aligarh Unit.

Stand on Indo-Palestine relations 
Haque supports India's stand in favor of Palestine. In an interview, he said, India has opposed the creation of Israel right from the days of its freedom struggle. Tilting toward Israel will definitely isolate India from the Muslim world. We should know that the conflict between Israel and the Muslim world is inevitable because of Israel’s contempt for international resolutions and international law. India’s interest will be best served by Supporting Palestine’s legitimate aspirations.

Views on terrorism 
He views terrorism as an act against humanity. "An act of terror which involves the killing of innocent people is contrary to the spirit of Quran and Islam because the holy book itself declares that to kill one human life is to kill entire humanity, and to save one human life is to save entire humanity. (Quran, 5:32). Islamic militancy is a misnomer in another sense also. The so-called Islamic militancy has killed more Muslims than any other community. In fact the Muslims are the worst affected victim of terrorism."

Views on nuclear weapons 
Haque is of the view that the politics of maintaining monopoly over the nuclear weapons and other WMD's by the Nuclear Weapons States (NWS) is characterized by double standards and is counterproductive for nuclear weapons free-world. The fact is that the presence of large number of dreaded nuclear weapons in a turbulent world is a serious threat to the very existence of living creatures on our planet.

Works
 International Terrorism and Violence: A Human Rights Perspective, Manak Publications,New Delhi, in collaboration with Aligarh Muslim University Press, Aligarh, 2011, .
 Corporate Globalisation and its Impact on Women in India,” in Debalina Banerjee (ed), Boundaries of the Self: Gender, Culture and Spaces, Cambridge Scholars Publishing, Newcastle upon Tyne, U.K., 2014, pp. 180-195.
 Endangered Minorities in India: Understanding the Role of Police,” in Asghar Ali Engineer and A.S. Narang (eds), Minorities and Police in India, Manohar Publications, New Delhi, 2006. . Pp. 111–121.
 The UN in the Unipolar World,” in T.A. Nizami (ed) Jawahar Lal Nehru: The Architect of India’s Foreign Policy Icon Publication, New Delhi, 2006,. .pp.326.
 Police Atrocities and Endangered Minorities in India”, Abdulrahim Vijapur (ed.) Implementing Human Rights in the Third World: Essays on Human Rights, Dalits and Minorities, Manak Publications, New Delhi, 2008, pp. 195–209. 
 Appeasement of Muslims: Myth and Reality, Resurging India: National and International Scenario, Icon publication, New Delhi, 2009, pp. 85–98.
 Police and Minorities, Santosh Bharatiya (ed), Dalit and Minority Empowerment, Rajkamal Prakashan, New Delhi, 2008, pp. 315–321.
 Perspectives on Sir Syed and the Aligarh Movement, A. R. Kidwai (ed.)Sir Syed Ahmad Khan, Muslim Renaissance Man of India, a Bicentenary Commemorative Volume, Viva Books, New Delhi,2017, ,pp. 38–55.
 Indian Constitution and Rights of Minorities: An Overview in Arshikhan(ed.) Exclusion of Muslims in India, Tolerance, Participation and Legitimacy of the State, Genuine publications, New Delhi, 2017. . pp. 53–74.
 Indian Judiciary and Minority Rights: A study of Select Cases, in Arshi khan(ed.) Exclusion of Muslims in India, Tolerance, Participation and Legitimacy of the State, Genuine pub,New Delhi, 2017. . pp. 155–78.
 Constituent Assembly Debates on Minority Rights”, P-09, Human Rights of Minorities, Module-04, UGC epathshala.
 National Commission for Minorities: Protecting the Legal and Constitutional Rights of Minorities in India”, P-09, Human Rights of Minorities,Module-08,UGC epathshala.

Articles and seminar
He has participated in several National and International seminar and Conferences prominent among them are following-
 Beyond Liberalism: Contemporary Relevance of Marxism at the International Conference on Examining the Relevance of Marx and Marxism to Contemporary Global Society, organized by Global Discourse in collaboration with School of Geography, Politics, Sociology, Newcastle University, U.K. 29–30 January 2011.
 Presented paper entitled, Beyond Liberalism: Islamic Perspectives on Justice and Mutual Respect at the International seminar on Dialogue between Civilizations, organized by Global Civilizations Study Centre, London, U.K. 23–25 May 2008.
 Shared views and experiences at Muslim Leaders of Tomorrow Conference, Doha, Qatar, 16–19 January 2009.
 Presented paper entitled “Making Turkey a Destination for South Asian Students: Issues and Prospects”, in the International Students Symposium, Istanbul, Turkey, 24–25 December 2016.

Articles/ papers published in journals, magazines and newspapers
 Beyond Liberalism: Contemporary Relevance of Marxism, Indian Journal of Politics, Vol.45, NO: 1 & 2, 2011, Department of Political Science, AMU, Aligarh, pp. 59–74.
 China-India Relationship: bonhomie to hostility and then to rapprochement, International Journal of Physical and Social Sciences, Volume 4, Issue 3, Year 2014, Online , pp. 430–450.
 Terrorism and Counter terrorism: Issues and Challenges, The Discourse, Volume 3, Issue 1, January- March 2014, Jamshedpur, India, pp. 9–25.
 Contesting Liberalism: Islamic Concepts of Justice and Mutual Respect, Indian Journal of Politics,Vol.48, Nos. 1–2, January–June 2014, Department of Political Science, Aligarh Muslim University, Aligarh., pp. 75–92.
 Spirituality, Religion and Corruption, Aligarh journal of Islamic Philosophy, No. 17, December 2011, Department of Philosophy, AMU, India, pp. 89–104.
 Jihad or Terrorism?: A Definitional Dilemma, Journal of the Institute of Islamic Studies, No.36, AMU, Aligarh, 2007. pp. 95–111 
 Socio-Political Ethics in Islam and the West: A Comparative Perspective, Eurasia Review: . 
 The Virtual Reality of Islamic Terrorism, Journal of the Institute of Islamic Studies, Number 38,2009, Aligarh Muslim University, Aligarh. pp. 69–78 
 Learning Lessons from Pakistan, Diplomatist, Vol. 3, Issue No. 6, June 2015, New Delhi, pp. 44–45.
 Institutional Mechanism for Monitoring Minority Safeguards in India: Role of the NCM, Indian Journal of Political Science(IJPOS), Volume 2 Number 2, July–December 2016, Red Flower Publications Pvt. Ltd. Delhi, pp. 97–110.
 Iran and the Emerging Confederation of the Shiite States, Eurasia Review, . 
 Islam and Politics in West Asia: An Overview, Indian Journal of Politics, Vol. 51, Nos. 3–4, July–December 2017, Department of Political Science, AMU Aligarh, pp. 1
 Deconstruction Of Discourse On Terrorism

Membership of professional bodies
 Member, Scientific Board, International journal of Social, Political and Economics Research (IJoSPER), IEDSR Association, Turkey.
 Member, Advisory Board, Aligarh Muslim University Gazette, AMU, Aligarh
 Group Coordinator for the Group Level Youth Parliament Competitions, 2017–2018, appointed by the Ministry of Parliamentary Affairs, Government of India.
 President, University Literary and Debating Club, AMU Aligarh. 
 5.Member, Editorial Board of the academic journal, Quest for justice, Ambedkar Chair of legal AMU Aligarh.
 Reviewer, Al-Barkat Journal of Finance and Management, (ISSN 0974-7281), Aligarh, U.P. India
 Reviewer, The Discourse, A bilingual refereed quarterly research journal of humanities and Social Sciences (ISSN 2278-0920), Jamshedpur, Jharkhand, India
 Member, Amnesty International India.
 Member, Institute of Objective Studies(IOS)Centre for Dialogue, Aligarh
 Member, Editorial Board, Indian Journal of Political Science, Red Flower Publications Pvt. Ltd. Delhi, Since 2016.

See also
Irfan Habib
Faizan Mustafa
Shakeel Ahmed Samdani

References

External links
 AMU's connection with Turkey | A talk by Dr Mohibul Haq | Janpatr
  Second High Profile Conference: Feedback: Dr Mohibul Haque
 Dr. M. Mohibul Haque's Address on Sir Syed Day Celebrations 2015
 Some lectures and speeches of MM Haque

Living people
Academic staff of Aligarh Muslim University
Aligarh Muslim University alumni
Year of birth missing (living people)